Levi Burt Michael (born February 9, 1991) is an American professional baseball shortstop who is a free agent.

Amateur career
Michael grew up in Welcome, North Carolina and attended North Davidson High School in Welcome and the University of North Carolina (UNC), where he played for the North Carolina Tar Heels baseball team, competing in the Atlantic Coast Conference. He graduated from high school in January 2009, a semester early, in order to enroll at UNC in time to play for the Tar Heels that February. As a freshman, Michael batted .290 with a .377 on-base percentage (OBP), a .527 slugging percentage (SLG), and 13 home runs. He was named to the Louisville Slugger Freshman All-America Team and National Collegiate Baseball Writers Association Freshman All-America Second Team in 2009.

As a sophomore, Michael batted .356 with a .480 OBP, .575 SLG, and nine home runs. After the 2010 season, he played collegiate summer baseball with the Harwich Mariners of the Cape Cod Baseball League, and was named a league all-star. As a junior, Michael batted .289 with 14 doubles, three triples, five home runs and 48 runs batted in. Michael played second base in his freshman year, third base in his sophomore year, and shortstop in his junior year.

Professional career

Minnesota Twins
Michael was drafted by the Minnesota Twins in the first round (30th overall) of the 2011 Major League Baseball Draft.

Michael began his professional career in 2012 with the Fort Myers Miracle of the Class A-Advanced Florida State League. In 117 games, he batted .246 with two home runs and 38 RBIs. He returned to Fort Myers in 2013, batting .229 with four home runs and 28 RBIs in 94 games. He began the 2014 season with Fort Myers, and received a midseason promotion to the New Britain Rock Cats of the Class AA Eastern League. In 45 games for Fort Myers he hit .305 with one home run and 21 RBIs, and in 15 games for New Britain he slashed .340/.444/.358. Michael spent the 2015 season with Minnesota's new Class AA affiliate, the Chattanooga Lookouts of the Southern League, where he batted .267 with five home runs and 31 RBIs in 63 games. He returned to Chattanooga in 2016 and hit .215 with two home runs and 27 RBIs in 96 games. In 2017, he began the season with Chattanooga and was promoted to the Class AAA Rochester Red Wings toward the end of the 2017 season. In 100 total games between the two clubs, he batted .262 with seven home runs and 49 RBIs. Michael was granted his release on March 26, 2018.

New York Mets
On March 27, 2018, Michael signed a minor-league contract with the New York Mets. He was assigned to the Class AA Binghamton Mets. Michael elected free agency on November 2, 2018.

San Francisco Giants
On November 20, 2018, Michael signed a minor-league deal with the San Francisco Giants. He became a free agent following the 2019 season.

Minnesota Twins (second stint)
On January 28, 2020, Michael returned to the Twins on a minor league deal with invitation to spring training. On November 2, 2020, Michael elected free agency.

References

External links

1991 births
Living people
People from Lexington, North Carolina
People from Welcome, North Carolina
Baseball players from North Carolina
Baseball shortstops
North Carolina Tar Heels baseball players
Harwich Mariners players
Minor league baseball players
Gulf Coast Twins players
Fort Myers Miracle players
New Britain Rock Cats players
Chattanooga Lookouts players
Rochester Red Wings players
Binghamton Rumble Ponies players
Águilas del Zulia players
Las Vegas 51s players
Richmond Flying Squirrels players
Sacramento River Cats players